Consolers of the Lonely is the second studio album by American rock band The Raconteurs. It was released on March 25, 2008, on Warner Bros. Records in most parts of the world, and a day earlier on XL Recordings in the UK.

The band did no promotion before the album's release, and its existence was only confirmed a week before. Even so, the record was accidentally leaked by iTunes, and some fans managed to purchase the album early. It is available on CD, vinyl, and MP3. A video for the first single from the album, "Salute Your Solution" was released on the same day. The album earned a nomination for Best Rock Album at the 51st Grammy Awards.

Background 
The band premiered "Five on the Five" during their last tour.
The title of the record comes from the inscription in the side of a Washington, D.C. post office written by Charles William Eliot, which reads in full:
Messenger of sympathy and love, servant of parted friends, consoler of the lonely, bond of the scattered family, enlarger of the common life.

Album cover 

The stage portrayed on the cover of the album depicts three signs for Tennessee, Michigan, and Ohio. These signs refer to the fact that the band members currently reside in Tennessee, but Brendan Benson and Jack White are originally from Michigan, while Patrick Keeler and Jack Lawrence are originally from Ohio. After being folded out the scene then depicts the band on stage with a woman exiting from a door in the back. It also has a sign that says "The Raconteurs" and another that says the album's title. Once opened up, it is noticed that the stage is empty and the bass drum in the back says "Sanitary Workers Band".

Release 
According to the band, the album was finished during the first week in March and was released less than three weeks later.  For a band of their stature, the release of Consolers of the Lonely with no promotion was highly unorthodox.  Music critics and commentators largely saw it as a way to eschew critics and deal directly with fans. The Observer called it "one of the most exciting musical events of 2008."  Despite the already rapid release time and efforts to secure the date, the record was briefly available for purchase on iTunes Friday, March 21.

A bluegrass version of "Old Enough" featuring Ricky Skaggs on mandolin and Ashley Monroe on vocals was recorded during a special live studio session. This version was nominated for the Country Music Association Award for Musical Event of the Year.

Critical response 

Critique of Consolers of the Lonely was mostly positive; much of it centered on the chaotic sound and diverse nature of the album as well as its resemblance to albums by Led Zeppelin and The Who.  According to The Toronto Star, "White's bent Americana and Benson's British invasion-isms yields wonderfully unpredictable results". Kitty Empire of The Observer called the album "lively" and said it "finds [the Raconteurs] luxuriating in fancy stuff with kid-in-a-sweetshop enthusiasm. Minimalism is out, bombast is in; the detail, is, as ever, lip-smacking." Commenting on the band's chemistry and freeness, Rolling Stone said the album is "a blissfully stoned conversation between White and Benson about their favorite bands: Led Zeppelin, the Who, Badfinger", though it added, "that freedom is not always satisfying." Austin-American Statesmen said "it's a weirdly overblown and curiously dull album," and complained about its production.  The New York Times echoed those statements about the "chaos" of the album, but concluded that "that desperation only makes the crunch of the music more euphoric." The Guardian found that on Consolers of the Lonely, the Raconteurs "establish a firm, emotionally charged identity of their own" and called the effort "flawed but ragged glory." Allmusic concluded that the album is a "lop-sided, bottom-loaded album that's better and richer than their debut."

The album was nominated for Best Rock Album and won Best Engineered Album, Non-Classical at the 51st Grammy Awards.  The album ranked No. 44 on Rolling Stone'''s year-end critic's list and No. 35 on Spin Magazine's year-end Top 40 albums.
The album was ranked the No. 4 Album of the Decade by Glide Magazine.

Grammy Awards

|-
| style="text-align:center;" rowspan="2"| 2009 || style="text-align:left;" rowspan="2"|Consolers of the Lonely'' || Best Rock Album || 
|-
| Best Engineered Non-Classical Album || 
|-

Commercial performance 

The album debuted at No. 7 on the U.S. Billboard 200 chart, selling about 42,000 copies in its first week. It debuted at No. 8 on the UK Album Chart, No. 4 on the Canadian Album Chart, and No. 50 on the Australian ARIA chart on April 7, 2008, based on digital downloads. However, the CD was released on April 5, thus allowing the album the next week to ascend 32 places to reach its peak position thus far of No. 18 due to physical sales.

Track listing 

All songs by Brendan Benson and Jack White, except "Rich Kid Blues" by Terry Reid.

Personnel

The Raconteurs 
 Patrick Keeler – drums, percussion
 Brendan Benson – vocals, guitar, organ, piano
 Jack White III – vocals, guitar, stylophone, piano, organ
 Jack L.J. Lawrence – bass guitar, banjo, backing vocals

Additional musicians 
 Dean Fertita – clavinet
 Dirk Powell – strings
 The Memphis Horns – horns
 Flory Dory Girls – backing vocals
 Frozen 140 Swanson (David Swanson of Whirlwind Heat)

Production 
 Jack White III – production, mixing, horn arrangements
 Brendan Benson – production, horn arrangements
 Joe Chiccarelli – engineering
 Vance Powell – mix down engineering
 Lowell Reynolds – assistant engineering
 Vlado Meller – mastering
 Mark Santangello – assistant
 The Raconteurs – song arrangements
 Wayne Jackson – horn arrangements

Charts

Certifications

Release history

References

2008 albums
The Raconteurs albums
Warner Records albums
Albums produced by Jack White
Third Man Records albums
Surprise albums
Grammy Award for Best Engineered Album, Non-Classical